Charles Nelson Pray (April 6, 1868 – September 12, 1963) was a United States representative from Montana and a United States district judge of the United States District Court for the District of Montana.

Education and career

Born on April 6, 1868, in Potsdam, St. Lawrence County, New York, Pray attended the public schools of Salisbury and Middlebury, Vermont, and graduated from Middlebury Union High School. He attended Middlebury College and received a Bachelor of Laws in 1891 from the Chicago College of Law (now the Chicago-Kent College of Law). He was admitted to the bar in 1892 and entered private practice in Chicago, Illinois from 1893 to 1895. He continued private practice in Fort Benton, Montana from 1896 to 1906. He was an assistant prosecutor for the Twelfth Judicial District in Chouteau County, Montana from 1897 to 1898, and Prosecutor for the same district from 1899 to 1906, being elected to that post in 1898, 1900, 1902 and 1904.

Congressional service

Pray was elected as a Republican to the United States House of Representatives of the 60th, 61st and 62nd United States Congresses, serving from March 4, 1907, to March 3, 1913. He was an unsuccessful candidate for reelection in 1912 to the 63rd United States Congress. He resumed the practice of law in Great Falls, Cascade County, Montana starting January 1, 1914. He was an unsuccessful candidate for election to the United States Senate in 1916.

Federal judicial service

Pray was nominated by President Calvin Coolidge on January 21, 1924, to the United States District Court for the District of Montana, to a new seat authorized by 42 Stat. 837. He was confirmed by the United States Senate on February 8, 1924, and received his commission the same day. He served as Chief Judge from 1948 to 1957. He assumed senior status on April 10, 1957. His service terminated on September 12, 1963, due to his death in Great Falls, Montana. He was interred in Hillcrest Lawn Memorial Cemetery.

Papers

Pray's papers 1878–1963, including diaries and correspondence, are lodged at the University of Montana in Missoula.

Honor

The town of Pray, Montana is named for Pray.

References

Sources
 
 
 

1868 births
1963 deaths
Politicians from Great Falls, Montana
Judges of the United States District Court for the District of Montana
United States district court judges appointed by Calvin Coolidge
20th-century American judges
Middlebury College alumni
People from Potsdam, New York
Republican Party members of the United States House of Representatives from Montana
People from Fort Benton, Montana